The paradox of the pesticides is a paradox that states that applying pesticide to a pest may end up increasing the abundance of the pest if the pesticide upsets natural predator–prey dynamics in the ecosystem.

Lotka–Volterra equation 
To describe the paradox of the pesticides mathematically, the Lotka–Volterra equation, a set of first-order, nonlinear, differential equations, which are frequently used to describe predator–prey interactions, can be modified to account for the additions of pesticides into the predator–prey interactions.

Without pesticides 
The variables represent the following:

 

The following two equations are the original Lotka–Volterra equation, which describe the rate of change of each respective population as a function of the population of the other organism:

 

By setting each equation to zero and thus assuming a stable population, a graph of two lines (isoclines) can be made to find the equilibrium point, the point at which both interacting populations are stable.

These are the isoclines for the two above equations:

Accounting for pesticides 

Now, to account for the difference in the population dynamics of the predator and prey that occurs with the addition of pesticides, variable q is added to represent the per capita rate at which both species are killed by the pesticide. The original Lotka–Volterra equations change to be as follows:

 

Solving the isoclines as was done above, the following equations represent the two lines with the intersection that represents the new equilibrium point. These are the new isoclines for the populations:

 

As one can see from the new isoclines, the new equilibrium will have a higher H value and a lower P value so the number of prey will increase while the number of predator decreases. Thus, prey, which is normally the targeted by the pesticide, is actually being benefited instead of harmed by the pesticide.

Empirical evidence 

The paradox has been documented repeatedly throughout the history of pest management. Predatory mites, for example, naturally prey upon phytophagous mites, which are common pests in apple orchards. Spraying the orchards kills both mites, but the effect of diminished predation is larger than that of the pesticide, and phytophagous mites increase in abundance.

The effect has also been seen on rice, as documented by the International Rice Research Institute, which noted significant declines in pest populations when they stopped applying pesticide.

Related phenomena 

Recent studies suggest that such a paradox might not be necessarily caused by the reduction of the predator population by harvesting itself, for example, by a pesticide. The host population is reduced at the moment of harvesting, and simultaneously, the intraspecific density effect is weakened. Intraspecific competition accounts for the competition between individuals of a same species. When the population density is high and resources are consequently relatively scarce, each individual has less access to resources to invest energy in growth, survivorship and reproduction. That causes a decrease in the survival rate or an increase in mortality.

Intraspecific competition increases with density. One could expect that a population decrease (due to harvesting, for example) will decrease the population density and reduce intraspecific competition, which would lead to a lower death rate among the prey population.

Studies show also that direct effects on the predator population, through harvesting of the prey, are not necessary to observe the paradox. Harvesting of prey has been shown to trigger a reduction in the predator’s reproduction rate, which lowers the equilibrium predator level. Thus, changes in life history strategy (patterns of growth, reproduction and survivorship) can also contribute to the paradox. 
 
Seemingly the paradox can be accounted for by the indirect effects of harvesting on the native ecological interactions of prey and predator: reduction of intraspecific density effect for the prey and reduction of the reproductive rate for the predator. The former increases the population recovery of the prey, and the latter decreases the equilibrium population level for the predator.

Solutions 

To deal with the paradox, growers may turn to integrated pest management (IPM), an ecological approach to pest control that accounts for the interactions between pests and their environment. There is not only one way to practice IPM, but some methods include using mechanical trapping devices or increasing the abundance of natural predators.

IPM is also often touted for its environmental and health benefits, as it avoids the use of chemical pesticides.

See also 
 Plateau effect
 List of paradoxes
 Paradox of enrichment: Increasing the food available to an ecosystem may introduce instability, and may even lead to extinction.

References 

Paradoxes
Pesticides